This list of the Paleozoic life of Wisconsin contains the various prehistoric life-forms whose fossilized remains have been reported from within the US state of Wisconsin and are between 538.8 and 252.17 million years of age.

A

 †Acernaspis
 †Acheilops
 †Acidaspis
 †Acrotreta
 †Actinoceras
 †Actinopteria
 †Actinopteria brisa
 †Actinurus
  †Aglaspis
  †Agraulos
 †Agraulos woosteri
 †Alveolites
 †Amphicoelia
 †Amphicoelia leidyi
 †Amphicyrtoceras
 †Amphicyrtoceras laterale
 †Amphicyrtoceras orcas
 †Amplexopora
 †Amplexopora minnesotensis
 †Amplexus
 †Amplexus fenestratus
 †Anastrophia
 †Anastrophia internascens
 †Anatolepis – tentative report
 †Anatolepis heintzi
 †Ancrinurus
 †Ancrinurus nereus
 †Antirhynchonella
 †Antirhynchonella ventricosa
 †Arcadiaspis – type locality for genus
 †Arcadiaspis bispinata – type locality for species
 †Archinacella – type locality for genus
 †Archinacella powersi – type locality for species
  †Arctinurus
 †Arctunurus
 †Arenosicaris
 †Armonia
 †Ascoceras
 †Ascoceras croneisi
 †Aspeluindia
 †Aspeluindia fluegeli
 †Astraeospongium
 †Athyris
 †Athyris vittara
 †Atrpina
 †Atrpina magnaventra
 †Atrypa
 †Atrypa pronis
  †Atrypa reticularis – tentative report
 †Atrypina
 †Atrypina magnaventra

B

 †Beloitoceras – or unidentified related form
 †Billingsella
 †Bucanella
  †Bumastus
 †Bumastus armatus
 †Bumastus cuniculus
 †Bumastus dayi
 †Bumastus ioxus
 †Bumastus niagarensis
 †Bumastus tenuis
†Bumastoides
 †Burnetiella
 †(The butterfly animal)- type locality of the organism 
 †Buthograptus
 †Buthograptus gundersoni – type locality for species
 †Buthograptus meyeri – type locality for species

C

 †Calliocrinus
 †Calliocrinus cornatus
 †Calliocrinus cornutus
 †Calliocrinus longispinus – or unidentified comparable form
 †Calvinella
 †Calvinella wisconsinensis – or unidentified comparable form
 †Calymene
  †Calymene celebra
 †Camaraspis
 †Camerella
 †Campylorthis
 †Campylorthis deflecta
 †Capelliniella
 †Capelliniella mira
 †Caryocrinites
 †Caryocrinites ornatus – or unidentified comparable form
  †Catenipora
  †Cedaria
 †Ceratocephala
 †Ceratocephala goniata
 †Cerauromerus
 †Cerauromerus hydei
 †Ceraurus
 †Ceraurus hydei
 †Ceraurus plattinensis
 †Cheirurus
 †Cheirurus niagarensis
 †Chippewaella – type locality for genus
 †Chippewaella patellitheca – type locality for species
†Climactichnites
 †Chondrites
 †Chonetes
 †Chonetes schucherti
 †Clathrospira                         
 †Clathrospira subconica
 †Conaspis
 †Conchidium
 †Conchidium multicostatum
  †Conocoryphe
 †Conotoma
 †Conotoma bispiralis
 †Coolina
 †Coolina subplana
 †Coolinia
 †Coolinia applanata
 †Coolinia subplana
 †Coosia
 †Corbina
 †Corbinia
 †Corbinia burkhalteri – type locality for species
  †Cornulites
 †Corynotrypa
 †Corynotrypa abrupta
 †Cranaena
 †Cranaena subovata
 †Cranaena thomasi
 †Crateroceras
 †Crateroceras raymondi
 †Crepicephalus
  †Crotalocrinites
 †Crotalocrinites cora
 †Ctenodonta
 †Ctenodonta nasuta
 †Cupulocrinus
 †Cupulocrinus levorsoni
 †Cyathaxonia
 †Cyathaxonia wisconsinensis
 †Cyathocrinites – tentative report
 †Cyathocrinites vanhornei
 †Cycloceras
 †Cycloceras niagarense
 †Cypricardinia
 †Cypricardinia arata
 †Cyrtia
 †Cyrtia meta
 †Cyrtina
 †Cyrtina triqueira
 †Cyrtina umbonata
 †Cyrtocerina
 †Cyrtocerina crenulata – type locality for species
 †Cyrtodonta
 †Cyrtodonta huronensis
 †Cyrtorizoceras
 †Cyrtorizoceras dardanus
 †Cyrtorizoceras fosteri
 †Cyrtorizoceras lucillum
 †Cyrtorizoceras unguicurvatum
 †Cyrtospira
 †Cyrtospira ventricosus
 †Cystiphyllum
 †Cystiphyllum niagarense

D

 †Dalejina
  †Dalmanites
 †Dalmanites illinoiensis
 †Dalmanites illinoisensis
 †Dalmanites platycaudatus
 †Dawsonoceras
 †Dawsonoceras nodocostatum
 †Decoriconus
 †Decoriconus fragilis
 †Decoroproetus
  †Deiphon
 †Deiphon americanus
 †Dendrograptus
 †Desquamatia
 †Dicellomus
 †Dicoelosia
 †Dicoelosia biloba
 †Dicranopeltis
 †Dicranopeltis decipiens
 †Dicranopeltis greeni
 †Dicranopeltis nasuta
  †Dikelocephalus
 †Dikelocephalus minnesotensis
 †Dimerocrinited
 †Dimerocrinited pentangularis
 †Dimerocrinites
 †Dimerocrinites occidentalis
 †Dimerocrinites pentangularis
 †Dinobolus
 †Dinobolus conradi
 †Dinorthis
 †Diplotrypa
 †Distomodus
 †Distomodus stenolophata
 †Distyrax
 †Dolerorthis
 †Dresbachia
 †Dudleyaspis

E

 †Echinochiton – type locality for genus
 †Echinochiton dufoei – type locality for species
 †Elita
 †Elita subundifera
 †Ellesmeroceras
 †Ellesmeroceras hotchkissi
  †Ellipsocephalus
 †Ellsworthoconus
 †Ellsworthoconus barabuensis
 †Elrodoceras
 †Elrodoceras abnorme
 †Elvinia
  †Encrinurus
 †Encrinurus egani
 †Encrinurus nereus
 †Encrinurus reflexus
  †Entomaspis
 †Eodictyonella (formerly Dictyonella)
 †Eodictyonella reticulata
 †Eoleperditia
 †Eoleperditia fabulites
 †Eophacops
 †Eophacops handwerki
 †Eoplectodonta
 †Eospirifer
 †Eospirifer radiatus
 †Eosyringothyris
 †Eosyringothyris occidentalis
 †Eridotrypa
 †Escharopora
 †Eucalyptocrinites
 †Eucalyptocrinites crassus
 †Eucalyptocrinites depressus
 †Eucalyptocrinites nodolosus
 †Eucalyptocrinites nodulosus
 †Eucalyptocrinites ornatus
 †Eunema
 †Eunema fatua
 †Euomphalopterus
 †Euomphalopterus alatus
 †Eurekia
 †Eurekia eos – or unidentified comparable form
 †Eurychilina
 †Eurychilina subradiata

F

  †Favosites
 †Foerstephyllum
 †Fusispira
 †Fusispira schucherti – type locality for species
 †Fusispira ventricosa

G

 †Gabriceraurus
 †Geisonocerina
 †Geisonocerina wauwatosense
 †Glomospirella
 †Glomospirella exserta
 †Gomophocystites
 †Gomophocystites glans
 †Gomphocystites
 †Gomphocystites glans
 †Goniophora
 †Goniophora quadrilatera
 †Gyronema
 †Gyronema pulchellum – type locality for species
 †Gyronema semicarinatum

H

 †Hadromeros
 †Hadromeros welleri
 †Hallicystis
 †Hallicystis imago
  †Halysites
 †Harpidella
 †Harpidium
 †Harpidium racinensis
 †Harrisoceras
 †Harrisoceras orthoceroides
 †Hedeina
 †Helicotoma
 †Helicotoma planulata
 †Helicotoma umbilicata
 †Heliolites
 †Hesperorthis
 †Hesperorthis concava
 †Hesperorthis tricenaria
 †Hexameroceras
 †Hexameroceras septoris
 †Hineacrinus
 †Hineacrinus angusta – or unidentified comparable form
 †Holocystites
 †Holocystites abnormis
 †Holocystites alternatus
 †Holocystites cylindricus
  †Holopea
 †Holopea ampla
 †Holopea guelphensis
 †Hormotoma
 †Hormotoma gracilis
 †Housia
 †Howella
 †Howellella
 †Huenella
  †Hyolithes
 †Hypseloconus
 †Hypsiptycha

I

 †Ichyocrinus
 †Ichyocrinus subangularis
 †Idahoia
 †Illaenoides
 †Illaenoides triloba
 †Illaenurus
 †Illaenus
  †Inversoceras
 †Inversoceras dayi
 †Irvingella
 †Ischadites
 †Ischadites tenuis
 †Isorthis
 †Isorthis clivosa
  †Isotelus
 †Isotelus simplex

J

 †Janius
 †Janius nobilis
 †Januns
 †Januns nobilis
 †Jonesea

K

  †Kionoceras
 †Kionoceras scammoni
 †Kosovopeltis
 †Kosovopeltis acamas
 †Kosovopeltis acamus
 †Krausella

L

 Lagenammina
 †Lambeophyllum
 †Lambeophyllum profundum
 †Lampterocrinus
 †Lampterocrinus inflatus
 †Leangella
 †Leangella dissiticostella
 †Lecanocrinus
 †Lecanocrinus waucoma
 †Lecanocrinus waukoma
 †Lechritrochoceras
 †Lechritrochoceras desplainense
  †Leonaspis
 †Leperditella
 †Leperditella germana
 †Lepidocyclus
 †Leptaena
 †Leptaena depressa
 †Leptaena rhomboidalis
 †Leptodesma
 †Leptodesma actualaris
 †Leptotrypa
 †Leptotrypa hexagonalis
 †Lesueurilla
 †Lesueurilla beloitensis
 †Leurocycloceras
 †Leurocycloceras raymondi
 †Levicyathocrinites – tentative report
 †Levicyathocrinites vanhorni
  †Lingula
 †Lingula milwaukeensis
  †Lingulella
 †Lingulepis
 †Lingulidiscina
 †Lingulidiscina marginalis
 †Linnarssonella
 †Liospira
 †Litagnostus
 †Lonchocephalus
 †Lophospira
 †Lophospira serrulata
 †Loxonema
 †Loxonema leda
 †Loxoplocus – type locality for genus
 †Loxoplocus gothlandicus
 †Loxoplocus nelsonae – type locality for species
 †Lyriocrinus – tentative report
 †Lyriocrinus melissa
 †Lysocystites
 †Lysocystites nodosus

M

 †Mackenziurus
 †Mackenziurus lauriae
 †Maclurina
 †Maclurina bigsbyi
 †Macropleura
 †Macropleura eudora
 †Macroscenella
 †Macroscenella superba
 †Macrostylocrinus
 †Macrostylocrinus obconicus
 †Macrostylocrinus semiradiatus – or unidentified comparable form
 †Macrostylocrinus striatus – or unidentified comparable form
 †Manespira
 †Manespira nicolleti – report made of unidentified related form or using admittedly obsolete nomenclature
 †Marsupiocrinus
 †Marsupiocrinus chagoensis
 †Maryvillia
 †Matheria
 †Matheria recta
  †Matthevia
 †Megamyonia
 †Megastrophia
 †Megastrophia profunda
 †Melocrinites
 †Menomonia
 †Merista
 †Meristina
 †Meroperix
 †Metarizoceras
 †Metarizoceras brevicorne
 †Metaspyroceras
 †Metaspyroceras reudemanni
 †Metaspyroceras ruedemanni
 †Michelinoceras
 †Milaculum
 †Monocheilus
  †Monograptus
 †Monograptus spiralis
 †Monomuchites
 †Monomuchites annularis
 †Morinorhynchus
 †Mosineia- type locality of the genus
 †Murchisonia
 †Murchisonia conradi
 †Murchisonia laphami
 †Myelodactylus
 †Mytilarca
 †Mytilarca acutirostra

N

 †Neozaphrentis
 †Neozaphrentis racinensis
 †Norwoodia
 †Nucleospira

O

 †Obolus
 †Oepikina
 †Oepikina minnesotensis
 †Onniella
 †Ophiletina
 †Ophiletina sublaxa
 †Ophioceras
 †Ophioceras wilmingtonense
 †Opikina
 †Orbicudloidea
 †Orbicudloidea telleri
 †Orbiculoidea
 †Orbiculoidea doria
 †Oriostoma
 †Oriostoma globosum
 †Oriostoma pauper
 †Orthonata
 †Orthospirifer
 †Orthospirifer milwaukeensis
 †Otarion
 †Otusia
 †Owenella
 †Owenella antiquata
 †Oxoplecia
 †Oxoplecia niagarensis
 †Ozarkodina
 †Ozarkodina polinclinata – or unidentified comparable form

P

 †Pagodia
 †Palaeocardia
 †Palaeocardia cordiiformis
 †Palaeoneilo
 †Palaeoneilo constricta
 †Palaeophycus
 †Panderodus
 †Panderodus gracilis
 †Panderodus greenlandensis
 †Panderodus unicostatus
†Parioscorpio- type locality of the genus 
 †Paraliospira
 †Paraliospira supracingulata – type locality for species
 †Parastophinella
 †Parastophinella multiplicata
 †Parastrophinella
 †Parastrophinella multiplicata
  †Pelagiella
 †Pemphigaspis
 †Pentamerella
 †Pentamerella multicosta
 †Pentamerus
 †Pentamerus oblongus
 †Pentlandia
 †Pentlandia glypta
 †Pentlandina
 †Pentlandina glypta
  †Periechocrinus
 †Periechocrinus infelix
 †Periechocrinus necis
 †Periechocrinus uniformis
 †Periechocrinus urniformis
 †Periechorinus
 †Phanerotrema
 †Phanerotrema occidens
 †Philhedra
 †Philhedra magnacostata
 †Pholidostrophia
 †Pholidostrophia iowensis
 †Phragmoceras
 †Phragmoceras nestor
 †Phragmoceras parvum
 †Phragmoceras procerum
 †Phragmolites
 †Phragmolites triangularis
 †Pionodema
 †Pionodema conradi
 †Pisocrinus
  †Plaesiomys
  †Plagiostomoceras
 †Planolites
  †Platyceras
 †Platyceras niagarensis
 †Platyceras wisconsinensis – type locality for species
  †Platystrophia
 †Platystrophia biforata
 †Plectatrypa
 †Plectatrypa imbricata
 †Plectodonta
 †Plethopeltis
  †Pleurodictyum
  Pleurotomaria
 †Pleurotomaria perlata
 †Polygnathoides
 †Polygrammoceras
 †Praenucula
 †Primitella
 †Primitella constricta
 †Proagnostus
 †Proetus
 †Proetus handwerki
 †Promelocrinus
 †Promelocrinus obpramidalis
 †Promelocrinus obpyramidalis
 †Proplina – tentative report
 †Proplina extensum
 †Prosolarium
 †Prosolarium halei
 †Protokionoceras
 †Protokionoceras medullare
 †Protomegastrophia
 †Prozacompsus
 †Pseudagnostus
 †Pseudooneotodus
 †Pseudooneotodus beckmanni
 †Pseudooneotodus bicornis
 †Ptychaspis
 †Ptychocaulus
 †Ptychocaulus bivittata
 †Ptychopleurella
 †Pycnocrinus
 †Pycnocrinus gerki
 †Pycnomphalus
 †Pycnomphalus solarioides

R

 †Rafinesquina
 †Rasettia
 †Reserella
 †Reserella canalis
 †Resserella
 †Resserella canalis
 †Reticulatrypa
 †Rhombopteria
 †Rhynchotrema
 †Rhynchotreta
 Rostricellula
 †Rostricellula minnesotensis
 †Ruedemannia
 †Ruedemannia lirata
 †Ruedemannia robusta
 †Rusosa

S

 †Sactorthoceras
 †Sactorthoceras depressum
†Saffordia
 †Salmanites
 †Salmanites platycaudatus
 †Salpingostoma
 †Salpingostoma buelli
 †Saukia
  †Saukiella
 †Scaevogyra
 †Scharyia
 †Schizonema
 †Schizopea
 †Schizophoria
 †Schizophoria iowensis
 †Schizophoria lata
 †Schmidtella
 †Schmidtella crassimarginata
 †Scotoharpes
 †Scotoharpes telleri
 †Scutellum
 †Similodonta
 †Sinuites
 †Sinuites cancellatus
 †Sinuites rectangularis – type locality for species
 †Sinuopea
 †Sinuopea sweeti – type locality for species
 †Siphonocrinus
 †Siphonocrinus armosus
 †Siphonocrinus nobilis
 †Siphonocrinus nobilus
 †Skenidioides
 †Skenidioides anthonensis
   †Skolithos
 †Sowerbyella
  †Sphaerexochus
 †Sphaerexochus roemingeri
 †Sphaerexochus romingeri
 †Sphaerirhynchia
 †Sphooceras
 †Spinatrypa
 †Spinatrypa hystrix
 †Spinatrypa spinosa
 †Spinocyrtia
 †Spinocyrtia iowensis
 †Spirodentalium
 †Spirodentalium osceola – type locality for species
 †Staurocephalus
 †Staurocephalus obsoleta
 †Stegerhynchus
 †Stenopareia
 †Stenopareia imperiator
 †Stenopilus
 †Stephanocrinus
 †Stephanocrinus osgoodensis
 †Stictopora
 †Stictopora trentonensis
 †Straparollus
 †Straparollus mopsus
 †Straparollus paveyi
 †Streptelasma
 †Striispirifer
 †stromatoporoids
   †Strophomena
 †Strophomena costata
 †Strophomena halli
 †Strophomena plattinensis
 †Strophostylus
 †Strophostylus elevatus
 †Subulites
 †Subulites beloitensis – type locality for species

T

 †Taenicephalus
 †Tancrediopsis
 †Tellerina
 †Tetranota
 †Tetranota sexcarinata
 †Tetranota wisconsinensis
  †Thalassinoides
 †Thaleops
 Thurammina
 †Thurammina polygona
  †Thylacares – type locality for genus
 †Thylacares brandonensis – type locality for species
 †Tremanotus
 †Tremanotus angustata
†Trocholites
 †Trochonema
 †Trochonema beachi – tentative report
 †Trochonema beloitense
 †Trochurus
 †Trochurus welleeri
 †Trochurus welleri
 †Tylothyris
 †Tylothyris subvaricosa

U

 †Uranoceras
 †Uranoceras hercules

V

 †Vanuxemia
 †Virgiana
 †Virgiana mayvillensis 
†Venustulus (Type locality of the genus)

W

 †Walliserodus
 †Walliserodus curvatus
 †Westonia
 †Whitfieldella
 †Whitfieldoceras
 †Whitfieldia
 †Wilbernia
 †Wisconsinella – type locality for genus
 †Wisconsinella clelandi – type locality for species
 †Woosteroceras
 †Woosteroceras trempealeauense
 †Wurmiella
 †Wurmiella excavata

Z

 †Zaphrenthis
 †Zaphrenthis racinensis
 †Zophocrinus – tentative report

References

 

Paleozoic
Wisconsin